The Prattsville Commercial Building is a historic commercial building located at Prattsville in Greene County, New York.  It was built about 1824 and is a -story building constructed of massive hemlock timber frame on a dry laid fieldstone foundation.  It is built into the side of the east bank of Schoharie Creek.  It was built by Zadock Pratt (1790–1871), founder of Prattsville.

It was listed on the National Register of Historic Places in 1996.

References

Commercial buildings on the National Register of Historic Places in New York (state)
Commercial buildings completed in 1824
Buildings and structures in Greene County, New York
National Register of Historic Places in Greene County, New York